Field of Reeds is the third studio album by British art rock band These New Puritans, released on 10 June 2013 on Infectious Music. Produced by Jack Barnett and Graham Sutton, the album features prominent contributions from over thirty-eight session musicians, including jazz singer Elisa Rodrigues, and finds the band "reinventing themselves as a neoclassical ensemble." The album is the band's first without keyboardist Sophie Sleigh-Johnson, who departed from the band in 2012.

Released to widespread critical acclaim, Field of Reeds reached number ninety on the UK Albums Chart.

Background and recording
During the recording of Field of Reeds the band worked extensively with classical musicians and singers, including two large ensembles: the Stargaze Ensemble and the Synergy Vocal Ensemble. Regarding the recording process, vocalist and multi-instrumentalist Jack Barnett noted, "We pissed off a lot of people making this album, and drove a lot of people mad. We worked long hours of the day, every day. I'm a bit of a perfectionist. Maybe some of the musicians thought, 'It's some popular music project, we can all relax, put our feet up.' But it was a big challenge."

Release
On 13 June 2013 the band released a music video for the album's second track, "Fragment Two", directed by Daniel Askill. Videos were also made for "Organ Eternal" and "V (Island Song)".

Critical reception

Field of Reeds received highly positive reviews from critics. At Metacritic, which assigns a normalised rating out of 100 to reviews from professional critics, the album received an average score of 82 based on 26 reviews, indicating "universal acclaim".

In 2016, Fact placed Field of Reeds at number 26 on its list of the best post-rock albums of all time, with staff writer Chal Ravens describing the album as "one of only a few records that could claim to be a successor of Talk Talk's majestic strand of post-rock".

Track listing

Personnel

These New Puritans
Jack Barnett – vocals, piano, electric piano, organs, bass guitar, vibraphone, chromatic gongs, unpitched percussion, magnetic resonator piano, sound design, field recordings
George Barnett – drums, percussion, glass
Thomas Hein – bass guitar, roto-toms

Additional musicians
Singers
Elisa Rodrigues – vocals
Adrian Peacock – basso profondo
Elizabeth Turner – field recording vocal

Soloists
Nicholas Ellis – clarinet and bass clarinet soloist
Henry Lowther – flugelhorn and trumpet soloist
Lindsay Kempley – French horn soloist
Daniel West – tenor trombone and bass trombone soloist
Pete Smith – tuba soloist
Elspeth Hanson – viola soloist
Chris Laurence – double bass soloist
Toby Kearney – vibraphone soloist
Faith Leadbetter – piano and electric piano soloist

Stargaze Ensemble
Andre de Ridder – conductor
Nikolaus Neuser – flugelhorn, trumpet
Matthias Gödeker – French horn I
Stefan Most – French horn II
Florian Juncker – tenor trombone
Till Krause – bass trombone
Sebastian Kunzke – tuba
Paul Valikoski – violin I
Daniella Strasfogel – violin II
Justin Caullet – viola
Zoe Cartier – violoncello
Kristjan Orii Sigerleifsson – double bass

Synergy Vocal Ensemble
Micaela Haslam – director, soprano 
Julia Wilson-James – soprano
Heather Cairncross – alto
Rachel Weston – alto
Phillip Brown – tenor
Andrew Busher – tenor

Children of St Mary's Church of England Primary School
Charlie Dyer
Daisy Farthing
Maddie Farthing
Amber Motti
James Norris
Jacob Scotford
Bethany Scriven

Others
Ben McLusky – additional pipe organ
Andrew McPherson – magnetic resonator piano setup and calibration
Shiloh – hawk
Alan Vaughan – hawk handler
Roy at TGM Glazing – glazier
Stool Trinovante – saxocone

Recording personnel
Graham Paul Sutton – producer
Jack Barnett – producer
Phill Brown – recording engineer (ensemble recordings)
Ben McLusky – assistant engineer
Christian Bader – assistant engineer
Campbell Duncan – assistant engineer
Geoff Swan – assistant engineer
Mark "Spike" Stent – mixing
Stuart Hawkes – mastering

Artwork
George Barnett – artwork, other photography
Matthew Cooper – artwork
Paul Steet – artwork assistant
Jack Barnett – drawings
Willy Vanderperre – band photography

Charts

References

2013 albums
These New Puritans albums
Infectious Music albums